The Legislature VIII of Italy was the 8th legislature of the Italian Republic, and lasted from 20 June 1979 until 11 July 1983. Its composition was the one resulting from the general election of 3 June 1979.

Main chronology
The legislature saw the birth of a new political coalition that would have characterized the Italian politics during the 1980s. The so-called Pentapartito began in 1981 at a meeting of the Congress of the Italian Socialist Party (PSI), when the christian democrat Arnaldo Forlani and socialist Bettino Craxi signed an agreement with the "blessing" of Giulio Andreotti. As the agreement was signed in a trailer, it was called the "pact of the camper." The pact was soon defined "CAF" for the initials of the signers: Craxi–Andreotti–Forlani. With this agreement, the DC  recognized the equal dignity of the so-called "secular parties" of the majority (i.e., the Socialists, Social Democrats, Liberals and Republicans) and also guaranteed an alternation of government with them. In June 1981 republican Giovanni Spadolini became the first non-christian democrat to sworn in as Prime Minister of Italy.

With the birth of the Pentapartito, the possibility of the growth of the majority toward the Italian Communist Party (PCI) was finally dismissed.

During this legislature, the list of who belonged to the secret lodge P2 was published. The P2 was a Masonic lodge founded in 1945 that, by the time its Masonic charter was withdrawn in 1976, had transformed into a clandestine, pseudo-Masonic, ultraright organization operating in contravention of Article 18 of the Constitution of Italy that banned secret associations. In its latter period, during which the lodge was headed by Licio Gelli, P2 was implicated in numerous Italian crimes and mysteries, including the collapse of the Vatican-affiliated Banco Ambrosiano, the murders of journalist Mino Pecorelli and banker Roberto Calvi, and corruption cases within the nationwide bribe scandal Tangentopoli. P2 came to light through the investigations into the collapse of Michele Sindona's financial empire.

P2 was sometimes referred to as a "state within a state" or a "shadow government". The lodge had among its members prominent journalists, Members of Parliament, industrialists, and military leaders—including Silvio Berlusconi, who later became Prime Minister of Italy; the Savoy pretender to the Italian throne Victor Emmanuel; and the heads of all three Italian intelligence services (at the time SISDE, SISMI and CESIS).

When searching Licio Gelli's villa in 1982, the police found a document called the "Plan for Democratic Rebirth", which called for a consolidation of the media, suppression of trade unions, and the rewriting of the Italian Constitution.

The scandal subsequent the discovery of the members of the lodge brought to a deep crisis between the main political parties which were part of the government and ended with the official dissolution of the lodge with the Law 25 January 1982, n. 17.

Government

Parliamentary composition

Chamber of Deputies

 President: Nilde Iotti (PCI), elected on 20 June 1979
 Vice Presidents: Loris Fortuna (PSI, till 1 December 1982), Oscar Luigi Scalfaro (DC), Maria Eletta Martini (DC), Aldo Aniasi (PSI, from 14 December 1982), Pier Luigi Romita (PSDI, till 18 October 1980), Luigi Preti (PSDI, from 14 December 1980)

Senate of the Republic

 Presidents: 
Amintore Fanfani (DC), elected on 20 June 1979 and resigned on 1 December 1982; 
Tommaso Morlino (DC), elected on 9 December 1982 and deceased in office on 6 May 1983; 
Vittorino Colombo (DC), elected on 9 May 1983.
 Vice Presidents: Luigi Carraro (DC, till 8 November 1980), Adriano Ossicini (SI), Dario Valori (PCI), Giuseppe Ferralasco (PSI, till 6 December 1982), Tommaso Morlino (DC, from 21 January 1981 until 9 December 1982), Alberto Cipellini (PSI, from 16 December 1982), Vittorino Colombo (DC, from 20 January 1983 until 9 May 1983)

Senators for Life

References

Legislatures of Italy
1979 establishments in Italy
1983 disestablishments in Italy